Emil Străinu (born 30 April 1957 in Bucharest, Romania) is a Romanian army general in reserve, writer, journalist, ufologist, and politician. He was the leader of the Greater Romania Party (PRM) between 2015 and 2016. He is a founding member of ASFAN (Asociația pentru Studiul Fenomenelor Aerospațiale Neidentificate; Association for the Study of Unidentified Aerospace Phenomena).

He is an author of specialized books and radiolocation specialist. He has published numerous books, articles and studies in the field of airspace research about radiolocation methods, geophysical weapons, climatology, UFO phenomenon, and has participated in a large number of television shows. He has over 1,500 articles published between 1990–2014 in over 50 publications. He crossed the North Polar Circle five times (Alaska, Greenland, the Svalbard Islands, North of Murmansk, and Kamchatka) and the South Polar Circle, at Cape Horn, to the Arctic Continent. 

He has participated in expeditions and travels in areas such as: Alaska, Siberia, Tibet, Easter Island, Greenland, Iceland, Svalbard Islands, Himalayas, Lake Baikal, Kamchatka, Bering Strait (Vladivostok-Russia, Elena Kotzebuse-USA) etc. He has entered forbidden areas, such as Area 51, Gakota - HAARP or dangerous areas such as the deserts of Nevada, Atakama, New Mexico, Arizona, Mojave.

Works

Science fiction books 
 O.Z.N. Universuri paralele, Editura UMC, 1994, 
 Războiul radioelectronic: România - Decembrie 1989; Kosovo - Iugoslavia 1999, Editura Z 2000, 2004 (co-autor cu Sorin Topor)
 Războiul geofizic, Editura Academiei de Înalte Studii Militare, Bucharest, 2003 (teză de doctorat)
 OZN Universuri paralele, Editura UMC, 1994
 Săbiile zeului Marte - războiul radioelectronic, Editura Academiei de Înalte Studii Militare, 1996
 OZN în arhivele militare secrete, (co-autor) Editura Majadahonda, 1999;
 Men In Black - Poliția extraterestră, Editura Z 2000, 1999;
 Serviciile secrete și fenomenul OZN, Editura Z 2000;
 Războiul geofizic, Editura Phobos, 2006, 
 Fenomenul OZN și serviciile secrete, Editura Solaris Print, Bucharest, 2008, 
 OZN - Anchetatorii au viața scurtă, Editura Triumf, Bucharest, 2008, 
 Statueta blestemată - teorii și cercetări neconvenționale, Editura Triumf, Bucharest, 2008, 
 Cutremurele care vor lovi România - teorii și cercetări neconvenționale, Editura Triumf, Bucharest, 2009, 
 Operația Elster. Atentatul terorist de la 11 septembrie 2001 inspirat de un plan conceput de Hitler în 1943 !?, Brașov, Solaris, 2009, .
 Operațiunea Elster, colecția Armaghedon - vol.2, Editura Solaris Print, Bucharest, 2009, 
 Un OZN pentru Hitler, colecția Armaghedon - vol.1, Editura Solaris Print, Bucharest, 2009, 
 Fuhrerul și arma finală, colecția Armaghedon - vol.3, Editura Solaris Print, Bucharest, 2009, 
 Războiul psihotronic, Editura Solaris Print, Bucharest, 2009, 
 Razboiul informatic, Editura Triumf, 2009, 
 Parapsihologia si serviciile secrete, Editura Triumf, 2010, ed I 
 cu Ioana Vostinaru, C.I.A. Tentativele de asasinare ale lui Fidel Castro Ruz, Editura Axioma Print, 2016, 
 Efectul Dumitrache sau Teoria vibratorie a timpului, Editura Prestige, 2018, 
 Extraterestrul din lumea duală, Editura Darclee, 2021,

References

External links
 

1957 births
Living people
20th-century Romanian male writers
21st-century male writers
Romanian Land Forces generals
Leaders of political parties in Romania
People from Urziceni
Romanian science fiction writers
Ufologists